Mike Merriweather (born November 26, 1960) is a former American football linebacker  in the National Football League. He played for the Pittsburgh Steelers, Minnesota Vikings, New York Jets, and Green Bay Packers during the 1980s and 1990s.

Early life
Merriweather was born in Albany, New York, and attended Vallejo High School in northern California, where he played football, baseball, and basketball. He graduated from University of the Pacific in Stockton, where he played college football for the Tigers. Merriweather is a member of Alpha Phi Alpha fraternity.

Professional career
Merriweather was selected in the third round (70th overall) of the 1982 NFL Draft by the Pittsburgh Steelers.  He was elected to the Pro Bowl in three consecutive seasons: 1984, 1985, and 1986. In 1984, Merriweather was fifth in the NFL with fifteen sacks (Mark Gastineau led the league with 22), and was named first-team all-NFL that year. He was named the Steelers' Most Valuable Player in 1987.

After a salary dispute which saw him sit out the entire 1988 season, Merriweather was traded to the Minnesota Vikings for a first-round pick. In his first season with Minnesota in 1989, he became the first in NFL history to score the winning points in an overtime game with a safety when he blocked a punt out of the end zone in a game against the Los Angeles Rams for a final score of 23–21. Vikings' placekicker Rich Karlis had scored a then-record seven field goals, accounting for all 21 points that sent the game into overtime.

Merriweather's last year at Minnesota was 1992, and he played his final season in 1993 for the New York Jets and Green Bay Packers.

In 1993, Merriweather was inducted into the Pacific Athletics Hall of Fame. He was inducted into the Vallejo Sports Hall of Fame in 2004, and was inducted into the Sac-Joaquin Section Hall of Fame in 2012.

Life after the NFL
After leaving the NFL, Merriweather worked as an insurance broker in Sacramento, California. In 2013, he became the athletic director at Vacaville Christian High School. He and his wife Sandra live in Stockton, California.

References

External links
 
Career Stats at Pro Football Reference.
Article on his induction to the Vallejo Sports Hall of fame.

	

1960 births
Living people
American football linebackers
Pittsburgh Steelers players
Minnesota Vikings players
New York Jets players
Green Bay Packers players
American Conference Pro Bowl players
Pacific Tigers football players
University of the Pacific (United States) alumni
African-American players of American football
People from St. Albans, Queens
21st-century African-American people
20th-century African-American sportspeople